Burundi Pidgin French is a stably pidginized form of French spoken in the African nation of Burundi. It is one of several such pidgins in francophone countries. Infinitives tend to be used for all verb forms (e.g. vous savoi for vous savez 'you know'). It is unlikely to ever creolize, as the Rundi language is spoken by the entire Burundian population.

References

French-based pidgins and creoles
Languages of Burundi
French language in Africa